KBTN may refer to:

 KBTN (AM), a radio station (1420 AM) licensed to Neosho, Missouri, United States
 KBTN-FM, a radio station (99.7 FM) licensed to Neosho, Missouri, United States